Laakso is a Finnish surname. Notable people with the surname include:

Aleksi Laakso (born 1990), Finnish ice hockey defenceman
Eric Laakso (1956–2010), American football player
Jaakko Laakso (born 1948), Finnish politician
Juhani Laakso (1942–2014), Finnish sports shooter
Juho Laakso (1854–1915), Finnish tenant farmer and politician
Leo Laakso (1918–2002), Finnish ski jumper
Martti Laakso (born 1943), Finnish wrestler
Matti Laakso (born 1939), Finnish wrestler
Rob Laakso, American musician, record producer and engineer
Sheikki Laakso, Finnish politician
Tapio Laakso (born 1985), Finnish ice hockey defenceman
Teemu Laakso (born 1987), Finnish ice hockey defenceman

Finnish-language surnames